Adam Doleac is an American country music singer/songwriter signed to Arista Nashville. He has written songs with Darius Rucker and Kane Brown.

Background 

Doleac grew up in Hattiesburg, Mississippi.  His father and grandfather ran an electrical business. A natural athlete, Doleac passed up the family business to pursue sports. Before becoming a country music artist, Doleac excelled at many sports and played baseball for the University of Southern Mississippi, eventually appearing in the College World Series.

Doleac grew up listening to artists like Amos Lee, Dave Matthews Band, and John Mayer. His first country concert was Toby Keith.

Career 

Early in Doleac's career, the song "Whiskey's Fine", from his independent EP, caught the attention of SiriusXM's "The Highway Channel". The song would eventually reach number three on the Sirius XM "The Highway's" Hot Country Countdown. Doleac also started having success as a co-writer with other artists including Darius Rucker with whom he wrote the song "Don't". Doleac was then named to numerous rising star lists, including "Pandora Radio's 2018 Artists to Watch" and Rolling Stone Country's "New Country Artist You Need to Know".

In October 2019, Sony Music Nashville signed Doleac to the Arista Nashville imprint. The single "Famous" spent two weeks at No. 1 on Sirius XM "The Highway's" Hot Country Countdown, and was supported with a music video featuring former Bachelor couple Colton Underwood and Cassie Randolph. Doleac also released new pop-driven EP called Famous: The Remixes, just as the original version of "Famous" crossed 2 million streams on Spotify.

Doleac celebrated the support he has received from his parents with the track "Mom and Daddy’s Money" released in 2018.
In January 2019, Doleac supported country artist Ryan Hurd on tour with Niko Moon, followed by more touring with Mitchell Tenpenny and Scotty McCreery.

Doleac's debut studio album, Barstool Whiskey Wonderland, was released on September 30, 2022.

Discography

Albums
Barstool Whiskey Wonderland (Arista/Sony Music Nashville, 2022)

EPs
Famous: The Remixes (Independent, 2019)  
Adam Doleac (Independent, 2017)

Singles

References

External links
 

Living people
21st-century American singers
Country musicians from Mississippi
American country singer-songwriters
1988 births
Singer-songwriters from Mississippi